Clara Schlaffhorst (16 October 1863 in Memel, East Prussia, today Klaipėda in Lithuania – 1945) was with Hedwig Andersen founder of the , a method of respiration, speech and voice therapy.

Publications 
 Atmung and Stimme.
 Atmung Stimme Bewegung.

References

External links 
 

19th-century German women singers
Voice teachers
1863 births
1945 deaths
People from Klaipėda